List of British films from 1888 to 1919:

1888–1913

1914

1915

1916

1917

1918

1919

See also
 1888 in the United Kingdom
 1889 in the United Kingdom
 1890 in the United Kingdom
 1895 in the United Kingdom
 1896 in the United Kingdom
 1897 in the United Kingdom
 1898 in the United Kingdom
 1899 in the United Kingdom
 1900 in the United Kingdom
 1901 in the United Kingdom
 1903 in the United Kingdom
 1905 in the United Kingdom
 1906 in the United Kingdom
 1907 in the United Kingdom
 1908 in the United Kingdom
 1909 in the United Kingdom
 1910 in the United Kingdom
 1911 in the United Kingdom
 1912 in the United Kingdom
 1913 in the United Kingdom
 1914 in the United Kingdom
 1915 in the United Kingdom
 1916 in the United Kingdom
 1917 in the United Kingdom
 1918 in the United Kingdom
 1919 in the United Kingdom

References

External links
 IMDb 
 BFI 

1880s
Lists of 1880s films
Films
Lists of 1890s films
Films
Lists of 1900s films
Films
Lists of 1910s films
Films